Georg Paul Wannagat (26 June 1916 – 7 September 2006) was a German jurist and President of the Bundessozialgericht.

Biography 
Wannagat was born in Brzeziny (Poland) to the Protestant Pastor Albert Ludwig Wannagat and Lucie Adeline née Jahn. He studied law at the Universities of Warsaw and Erlangen and passed his juridical exams in 1938 and 1942.

After World War II he started to work at the Württemberg higher insurance office (Württembergisches Oberversicherungsamt) and became a judge at the State Court of Social law of Baden-Württemberg in 1954. In 1962 he became the President of the State Court of Social law of Hesse and in 1969 President of the Federal Social Court (Bundessozialgericht) in Kassel. He retired in 1984.

Wannagat was an honorary Professor at the University of Tübingen (1965) and the Johann Wolfgang Goethe-Universität, Frankfurt am Main (1967).

Wannagat died in Kassel.

Publications 
Lehrbuch des Sozialversicherungsrechts. Bd. 1, 1965
Entwicklung des Sozialrechts. Aufgabe der Rechtsprechung: Festgabe aus Anlass des 100jährigen Bestehens der sozialgerichtlichen Rechtsprechung, Kassel 1984
Kassel als Stadt der Juristen (Juristinnen) und der Gerichte in ihrer tausendjährigen Geschichte, Kassel 1990

References 

1916 births
2006 deaths
20th-century German judges
German Protestants
University of Warsaw alumni
University of Erlangen-Nuremberg alumni
Grand Crosses with Star and Sash of the Order of Merit of the Federal Republic of Germany